Windsor West is a federal electoral district in Ontario, Canada, that has been represented in the House of Commons of Canada since 1968.

Geography

The district consists of the part of the city of Windsor lying west and south of a line drawn from the U.S. border southeast along Langlois Avenue, east along Tecumseh Road East, and southeast along Pillette Road to the southern city limit.

Demographics
According to the 2021 Canada Census

Ethnic groups: 54.9% White, 12.1% Arab, 10.0% South Asian, 6.2% Black, 4.4% Chinese, 3.7% Indigenous, 2.3% Southeast Asian, 1.6% West Asian, 1.5% Latin American, 1.4% Filipino

Languages: 60.3% English, 8.4% Arabic, 2.4% Mandarin, 2.1% Italian, 1.7% Urdu, 1.6% Punjabi, 1.5% French, 1.2% Chaldean, 1.2% Spanish, 1.1% Gujarati, 1.0% Vietnamese, 1.0% Cantonese

Religion: 50.0% Christian (29.3% Catholic, 2.7% Anglican, 2.6% Christian Orthodox, 1.6% United Church, 1.3% Pentecostal, 1.3% Baptist, 11.2% Other), 16.0% Muslim, 3.8% Hindu, 1.6% Sikh, 1.3% Buddhist, 26.4% None

Median income: $34,000 (2020)

Average income: $44,080 (2020)

History

Windsor West riding was created in 1966 from parts of Essex East and Essex West ridings.

It consisted initially of the part of the City of Windsor and the Township of Sandwich West bounded on the west by the U.S. border, and on the north, east and west by a line drawn from the border east along County Road 28, north along Malden Road, east along Malden Road South, south along Huron Church Line Road, east along Cabana Road, north along Howard Avenue, west along the C.P.R. line, northwest along McDougall Avenue, east along Tecumseh Boulevard East, north along Elsmere Avenue, west along Elliott Street East, and north along Marentette Avenue to the border.

In 1976, it was redefined to consist of the part of the City of Windsor bounded on the west by the U.S. border, and on the north, east and west by a line drawn from the border south along Langlois Avenue, west along Tecumseh Boulevard East, south along McDougall Street, east along the Canadian Pacific Railway, south along Howard Avenue, and west along Cabana Road to the southwest city limit.

In 1987, it was redefined to consist of the part of the City of Windsor lying south and west of a line drawn from the U.S. border south along Langlois Avenue, west along Tecumseh Road East, south along McDougall Street, east along to the Canadian Pacific Railway line, and south along the Chesapeake and Ohio Railway line to the southern city limit.

In 1996, it was redefined to consist of the part of the City of Windsor lying south and west of a line drawn from the U.S.
border south along Langlois Avenue, west along Tecumseh Road East, and south along Pillette Road to the southern city limit. In 2004, The boundaries were not changed for this riding.

This riding was left unchanged after the 2012 electoral redistribution.

Members of Parliament

This riding has elected the following Members of Parliament:

Election results

|- bgcolor="white"

|align="left" colspan=2|New Democratic Party hold 

|- bgcolor="white"

|align="left" colspan=2|New Democratic Party hold 

|- bgcolor="white"

|align="left" colspan=2|New Democratic Party hold 
|align="right"|Swing
|align="right"|+0.29
|align="right"|

Note: Conservative vote is compared to the total of the Canadian Alliance vote and Progressive Conservative vote in 2000 election.

|Progressive Conservative
|Ian West
| style="text-align:right;" |957
| style="text-align:right;" |2.91
| style="text-align:right;" |−2.62
| style="text-align:right;" |$11,212

|- bgcolor="white"

|align="left" colspan=2|New Democratic Party gain from Liberal

Note: Canadian Alliance vote is compared to the Reform vote in 1997 election.

See also
 List of Canadian federal electoral districts
 Past Canadian electoral districts

References

Riding history from the Library of Parliament
 2011 results from Elections Canada
 Campaign expense data from Elections Canada

Notes

Politics of Windsor, Ontario
Ontario federal electoral districts